Rubus montensis a rare North American species of brambles in the rose family. It has been found only in the states of Pennsylvania, Maryland, North Carolina, and West Virginia in the eastern United States as well as the Province of Nova Scotia in eastern Canada.

The genetics of Rubus is extremely complex, so that it is difficult to decide on which groups should be recognized as species. There are many rare species with limited ranges such as this. Further study is suggested to clarify the taxonomy.

References

montensis
Plants described in 1932
Flora of Nova Scotia
Flora of the Eastern United States
Flora without expected TNC conservation status